HMS Repulse was the last wooden battleship constructed for the Royal Navy.

She was laid down as a 90-gun second-rate line-of-battle ship with two decks; having been approved for conversion to a broadside ironclad in 1861, work on her was intentionally delayed until the performance of earlier conversions from wooden hull to ironclad could be assessed. She was therefore eleven years from being laid down to completion, no work at all being undertaken on her between 1861 and 1866.

In 1864 Sir Edward Reed had been Chief Constructor for some eighteen months, and was in a position to stipulate the nature of the armament and the disposition of armour which Repulse should carry when construction should be resumed, which it was in 1866. Guns of 9-inch and 10-inch calibre were already afloat in the Royal Navy, and clearly similar weapons could be carried by potential adversaries. It followed that armour of 4.5 inches thickness, which since  had been regarded as adequate, could no longer be so considered. Thicker armour had therefore to be provided, which in turn meant that less of the side of the ship could be armoured, lest the displacement exceed the allowed tonnage. While the water-line belt was continuous from stem to stern, the armour over the battery stretched for only , the hull fore and aft of this being exposed wood. The risk of battle damage to these large unprotected areas was minimised by posting her the Pacific station, where combat with any unit of significant force was thought to be unlikely.

Repulse was always intended as an overseas flagship. She had the reputation of providing the best accommodation in the fleet, with the Captain's quarters under the poop, the Admiral's quarters on the main deck, and officers' cabins arranged either side of the poop, with most officers being able to bunk under an open port-hole, which in the tropics markedly enhanced comfort and habitability.

She covered more distance under sail alone than any ironclad except .

Service history
Her conversion finally started on 25 October 1866. She was commissioned in March 1870 and posted to Queensferry, where she served for two years as guardship. On 29 August 1871, she ran aground off the Isle of Sheppey, Kent. She was refloated, and was taken in to Sheerness the next day. Repulse was subsequently taken to Chatham Dockyard for inspection. She relieved Zealous as flagship, Pacific Fleet, and patrolled the seas from Patagonia to British Columbia for the next five years. The trip from the Pacific to Rio de Janeiro took her seven weeks; she was the only British armoured ship ever to round the Horn under canvas. She was under refit from 1877 to 1880, and was then guardship at Hull until 1885, in the days when a warship was stationed at every major British port. She was mobilized as part of the Royal Navy Evolutionary Squadron 1885 commanded by of Admiral Sir Geoffrey Phipps Hornby. The Repulse was then held in reserve until sold.

References
 Oscar Parkes  British Battleships 
 Conway  All the World's Fighting Ships

Footnotes

 

Bulwark-class battleships (1859)
Ships built on the River Thames
1868 ships
Victorian-era battleships of the United Kingdom
Maritime incidents in August 1871